Georges Lucien Démanet (6 December 1874 – 20 June 1943) was a French gymnast who competed at the turn of the 20th century. He participated in Gymnastics at the 1900 Summer Olympics in Paris and won the bronze medal with a total score of 293 points in the only gymnastic event to take place at the games, the combined exercises. Gustave Sandras won gold with a score of 302 points and Noel Bas won silver.

References

External links

1874 births
1943 deaths
French male artistic gymnasts
Olympic bronze medalists for France
Olympic gymnasts of France
Gymnasts at the 1900 Summer Olympics
Gymnasts at the 1920 Summer Olympics
Sportspeople from Nord (French department)
Olympic medalists in gymnastics
Medalists at the 1920 Summer Olympics
Medalists at the 1900 Summer Olympics
20th-century French people